Júlio César Machado Colares (born 21 July 1987), commonly known as Julinho, is a Brazilian footballer who plays for Ituano FC as a left back for Operário Ferroviário.

Honours
América-RN
Campeonato Potiguar: 2015

References

External links

1987 births
Living people
Sportspeople from Rio Grande do Sul
Brazilian footballers
Association football defenders
Campeonato Brasileiro Série B players
Campeonato Brasileiro Série C players
Campeonato Brasileiro Série D players
Grêmio Foot-Ball Porto Alegrense players
Esporte Clube Internacional players
Ypiranga Futebol Clube players
Canoas Sport Club players
Esporte Clube Juventude players
Boa Esporte Clube players
Capivariano Futebol Clube players
América Futebol Clube (RN) players
Associação Portuguesa de Desportos players
Esporte Clube XV de Novembro (Piracicaba) players
Cuiabá Esporte Clube players
R. Charleroi S.C. players
Gil Vicente F.C. players
Esporte Clube Água Santa players
Figueirense FC players
Sociedade Esportiva e Recreativa Caxias do Sul players
Sampaio Corrêa Futebol Clube players
Associação Ferroviária de Esportes players
Operário Ferroviário Esporte Clube players
Esporte Clube Santo André players
Ituano FC players
Brazilian expatriate footballers
Brazilian expatriate sportspeople in Belgium
Expatriate footballers in Belgium
Brazilian expatriate sportspeople in Portugal
Expatriate footballers in Portugal